Events in the year 1787 in the Austrian Netherlands and Prince-bishopric of Liège (predecessor states of modern Belgium).

Incumbents

Habsburg Netherlands
Monarch – Joseph II

Governors General – Maria Christina of Austria-Lorraine with Albert Casimir of Saxony

Minister Plenipotentiary – Ludovico di Belgiojoso; Sir Joseph Murray (acting, 19 July to 27 October); Ferdinand von Trauttmansdorff

Prince-Bishopric of Liège
Prince-Bishop – César-Constantin-François de Hoensbroeck

Events
 1 January – Joseph II, Holy Roman Emperor, decrees the abolition of existing law courts and the institution of new law courts for the Duchy of Brabant, to take effect from 1 May 1787, and a General Council of Government.
 29 January – States of Brabant, meeting in Brussels, admonish the Emperor that the Joyous Entry cannot be unilaterally altered.
 20 April – Council of Brabant declares its own abolition unconstitutional.
 23 April – Henri Van der Noot presents his "Mémoire sur les droits du peuple brabançon" to the States of Brabant.
 26 April – States of Brabant refuse to vote taxes until their grievances are addressed.
 28 May – Governors General Maria Christina and Albert suspend implementation of Joseph II's reforms.
 4 June – Guilds of Brussels assemble to enroll militiamen.
 19 July – Ludovico di Belgiojoso recalled as minister plenipotentiary; replaced as acting minister by Sir Joseph Murray
 July and August – First public disturbances that will become the Brabant Revolution.
 20 September – Fighting between Austrian troops and citizen militiamen in Brussels.
 21 September – Joseph II's interim minister plenipotentiary, Sir Joseph Murray, suspends the abolition of the Council of Brabant.
 27 October – Ferdinand von Trauttmansdorff arrives as minister plenipotentiary.
 17 December – Joseph II issues three new reform edicts.

Publications
 François-Xavier de Feller, Catéchisme philosophique ou Recueil d'observations propres a défendre la religion chrétienne contre ses ennemis (revised edition; Liège)
 Charles Lambert d'Outrepont, Considérations sur la constitution des duchés de Brabant et de Limbourg.

Art and architecture

Buildings
 Saint-Jacques-sur-Coudenberg in Brussels

Births
 28 April – Jean-Joseph Raikem, politician (died 1875)
 30 April – Charles d'Hane de Steenhuyze, politician (died 1858)
 16 November – François-Joseph Navez, painter (died 1869)
 3 December
 Eduard de Lannoy, composer (died 1853)
 Philippe Veranneman de Watervliet, mayor of Bruges (died 1844)

Deaths
 20 May – Jean Des Roches (born 1740), scholar

References

1787 in the Habsburg monarchy
Austrian Netherlands
1787 in the Holy Roman Empire